Joe Douglas (born July 20, 1976) is an American football executive who is the current general manager of the New York Jets of the National Football League (NFL). Prior to joining the Jets in 2019, Douglas was a member of the Baltimore Ravens, Chicago Bears, and Philadelphia Eagles.

Early life
Douglas was born and raised in the Old Church area of Mechanicsville, Virginia. He attended Lee-Davis High School there, where he was a two-time all-state offensive lineman. In college at the University of Richmond in Richmond, Virginia, Douglas was in the Football Championship Subdivision (FCS) of the NCAA, where he started 45 consecutive games for the Richmond Spiders, and in his senior year was named All-Atlantic 10 selection. Before his senior year at Richmond, he interned for United States Senator Max Cleland. Douglas was a volunteer assistant coach for the Richmond football team after graduation.

Executive career

Baltimore Ravens
Douglas began his career in the NFL by working in the personnel department on the Baltimore Ravens in 2000 where he worked until 2015.

Chicago Bears
For the 2015 season, Douglas was director of college scouting for the Chicago Bears.

Philadelphia Eagles
In 2016, Douglas joined the Philadelphia Eagles to become their vice president of player personnel.

New York Jets
On June 7, 2019, Douglas signed a six-year contract to become the general manager of the New York Jets.

Personal life
Douglas is married to his wife Shannon, and they have three children together. He was an extra in the film The Replacements in 2000.

References

1976 births
Living people
New York Jets executives
People from Mechanicsville, Virginia
Philadelphia Eagles executives
Richmond Spiders football players
National Football League general managers